is a landmark case in English contract law, on undue influence. It is remarkable for the judgment of Lord Denning MR who advanced that English law should adopt the approach developing in some American jurisdictions that all impairments of autonomy could be collected under a single principle of "inequality of bargaining power."

Facts
Herbert James Bundy (Mr. Bundy) was a farmer. His son, Michael, owned a business that was in financial trouble. Mr. Bundy had already guaranteed the business with a £7,500 charge over his only asset, his farmhouse, to Lloyds Bank. Michael's company got into further financial difficulty. Mr. Bundy then increased his exposure to £11,000 after the assistant manager of Lloyds failed to notify him of the company's true financial condition. Lloyds foreclosed on the house when the money was not paid and Mr. Bundy had a heart attack in the witness box. The question was whether the contract leading to the repossession of the house was voidable for some iniquitous pressure.

Judgment

Lord Denning MR held that the contract was voidable owing to the unequal bargaining position in which Mr Bundy had found himself vis a vis the bank. He held that undue influence was a category of a wider class where the balance of power between the parties was such as to merit the interference of the court. It was apparent that Mr Bundy had, without independent advice entered the contract and it was very unfair and pressures were brought to bear by the bank.

Sachs LJ held that a presumption of undue influence had not been rebutted, because Herbert was not independently advised. He had placed himself in the hands of the bank. He noted the claimant's concession that ‘in the normal course of transactions by which a customer guarantees a third party's obligations, the relationship does not arise.’

When ‘the existence of a special relationship has been established, then any possible use of the relevant influence is, irrespective of the intentions of the person possessing it, regarded in relation to the transaction under consideration as an abuse – unless and until the duty of fiduciary care has been shown to be fulfilled or the transaction is shown to be truly for the benefit of the person influenced.’

No ‘advice to get an independent opinion was given; on the contrary, Mr Head chose to give his own views on the company's affairs and to take this course…’ So ‘the breach of the duty to take fiduciary care is manifest’. And although the counsel for the bank ‘urged in somewhat doom-laden terms’ that banking practice would be seriously affected was dismissed. He declined to express an opinion on Lord Denning's dicta.

Cairns LJ concurred.

Significance
This case should be considered to be a landmark case for contract law and especially the aspect of undue influence. it should be read alongside some other cases such as williams v bayley. The holding in the case of National Westminster Bank PLC v Morgan(1985) can also be compared and contrasted to this and appropriate reforms to contract law be made.

See also

Iniquitous pressure in English law

American cases
Williams v. Walker-Thomas Furniture Co., 350 F.2d 445 (D.C. Cir. 1965).

Duress
Barton v Armstrong [1976] AC 104
D & C Builders Ltd v Rees [1966] 2 QB 617
North Ocean Shipping Co Ltd v Hyundai Construction Co Ltd [1979] QB 705
Pao On v Lau Yiu Long [1980] AC 614
Universe Tankships Inc of Monrovia v International Transport Workers' Federation [1982] 2 All ER 67
CTN Cash and Carry Ltd v Gallaher Ltd [1994] 4 All ER 714
Atlas Express Ltd v Kafco [1989] QB 833

Undue influence
BCCI v Aboody [1992] 4 All ER 955
Barclays Bank plc v O'Brien [1993] 4 All ER 417
Royal Bank of Scotland v Etridge (No 2) [2001] UKHL 41
Tate v Williamson (1886) LR 2 Ch App 55

Unconscionability
Fry v Lane (1888) 40 Ch D 312
Cresswell v Potter [1978] 1 WLR 255
The Medina (1876) 2 PD 5
Alec Lobb Garages Ltd v Total Oil (GB) Ltd [1985] 1 WLR 173

Notes

References

Beale, Bishop and Furmston, Contract: Cases and Materials (OUP 2008) 954-963
H Collins, The Law of Contract: Law in Context (CUP 2003) 144
Slayton, ‘The Unequal Bargain Doctrine’ (1976) 22 McGill Law Journal 94, 106, says that this goes beyond undue influence in that (1) no confidential relationship or fiduciary duty is necessary (2) undue influence need not be proven as a fact but is presumed where bargaining power is impaired and the terms are unfair or consideration is grossly inadequate
Waddams, ‘Unconscionability in Contracts’ (1976) 39 Modern Law Review 369 supported the principle.

Lord Denning cases
English duress case law
English unconscionability case law
1974 in British law
Court of Appeal (England and Wales) cases
1974 in case law
Lloyds Banking Group
Foreclosure